Samuel Campbell   was a Major League Baseball infielder for the Philadelphia Athletics of the American Association in , their last year of existence.

External links

Major League Baseball second basemen
Philadelphia Athletics (AA) players
Baseball players from Philadelphia